The 2017–18 Brisbane Heat Women's season was the third in the team's history. Coached by Peter McGiffin and captained by Kirby Short, the Heat finished the regular season of WBBL03 in fifth place and failed to qualify for the finals. For the third year in a row, Beth Mooney won the team's Most Valuable Player award.

Squad
Each WBBL|03 squad featured 15 active players, with an allowance of up to five marquee signings including a maximum of three from overseas. Australian marquees were defined as players who made at least ten limited-overs appearances for the national team in the three years prior to the cut-off date (24 April 2017).

Personnel changes made ahead of the season included:

 Peter McGiffin was appointed head coach of the Heat, replacing Andy Richards.
 India marquee Smriti Mandhana did not return to the Heat after sustaining a ruptured anterior cruciate ligament during WBBL|02.
 Grace Harris returned to the Heat, having spent one season at the Melbourne Renegades.
 South Africa marquee Laura Wolvaardt signed as a replacement player for Grace Harris who would be unavailable for most of the season while recovering from injury.

The table below lists the Heat players and their key stats (including runs scored, batting strike rate, wickets taken, economy rate, catches and stumpings) for the season.

Ladder

Fixtures

Regular season

All times are local time

{{Single-innings cricket match|date=23 December 2017|venue=Etihad Stadium, Melbourne|rain=|notes=Streamed on cricket.com.au
 Double header with Match 6 of the Men's BBL
Brisbane Heat's total of 66 equalled the record for lowest all out WBBL team score|result=Melbourne Renegades won by 10 wickets (with 55 balls remaining)|report=Scorecard|umpires=Daryl Brigham and Dale Ireland|motm=Sophie Molineux (Renegades)|toss=Brisbane Heat won the toss and elected to bat|wickets2=|time=14:30|runs2=Sophie Molineux 45* (37)|wickets1=Amy Satterthwaite 2/5 (2 overs)|runs1=Deandra Dottin 14 (20)|score2=0/67 (10.5 overs)|score1=66 (16.1 overs)|team2=Melbourne Renegades|team1=Brisbane Heat|daynight=|round= Match 16|bg=#FFCCCC}}

Statistics and awards

 Most runs: Beth Mooney – 465 (4th in the league) Highest score in an innings: Delissa Kimmince – 87* (54) vs Perth Scorchers, 10 December 2017
 Most wickets: Jemma Barsby – 13 (equal 17th in the league) Best bowling figures in an innings: Jemma Barsby – 4/2 (2 overs) vs Sydney Thunder, 28 January 2018
 Most catches (fielder): Kirby Short – 9 (equal 3rd in the league) Player of the Match awards:
 Beth Mooney – 4
 Deandra Dottin, Grace Harris, Kirby Short – 1 each
 Heat Most Valuable Player: Beth Mooney
 WBBL|03 Player of the Tournament: Beth Mooney (equal 4th)''
 WBBL|03 Team of the Tournament: Beth Mooney

References

2017–18 Women's Big Bash League season by team
Brisbane Heat (WBBL)